Charles Taylor Hennigan, Sr. (March 19, 1935 – December 20, 2017) was an American football player with the former Houston Oilers of the American Football League (AFL).

Football career

Hennigan attended LSU on a track scholarship but wanted to play football. He therefore transferred to Northwestern State University (then Northwestern State College) in Natchitoches, Louisiana, where he became the star of the team. In 1960, he joined the American Football League's Houston Oilers in the team's first year of operation. Prior to joining the Oilers, he had taught high school biology at a salary of some $2,700 per year. He kept his teacher pay stub in his helmet to remind him that he must succeed in pro athletics.

Hennigan scored the first touchdown in Oilers history, catching a 43-yard touchdown pass from George Blanda in the first quarter against the Oakland Raiders. That year, he caught 44 passes for 722 yards, averaging 16.4 yard per catch. He had six touchdowns. In the 1960 American Football League Championship Game, he caught four passes for 71 yards as the Oilers prevailed 24-16 to win the inaugural AFL title over the Los Angeles Chargers. After a promising rookie season, in 1961, he started all 14 games and established himself as a superstar in the AFL by gaining 1,746 yards receiving with 12 touchdowns, the former being a pro football record that stood for 34 years. In October alone, he had 822 receiving yards, the most in a single calendar month. One of quarterback George Blanda’s main targets, Hennigan was the second professional football player to catch more than a hundred passes in a single season (101 in 1964, an AFL record) and to twice gain over 1,500 yards receiving (1961 and 1964). He holds the all-time records for most games in a season with over 200 yards receiving with three, and most games in a season with over 100 yards receiving with 11. Hennigan had the All-time AFL single game record of 272 yards receiving, against the Boston Patriots on October 13, 1961. The 13 passes caught in the game is tied for the most ever in the AFL, shared with Lance Alworth, Lionel Taylor, and Sid Blanks. In the 1961 American Football League Championship Game, he had five catches for 43 yards as the Oilers prevailed for their second and final AFL title.

On January 19, 1962, Minden observed "Charlie Hennigan" Day. Then State Senator Harold Montgomery, State Representative, Parey Branton, Mayor Frank T. Norman, and other local officials presented Hennigan with a signed document of his accomplishments. A luncheon and evening meal were served in his honor. The event was postponed because of hazardous weather the previous week. That year, he had 54 catches for 867 yards with eight touchdowns. In the AFL title game, he had three catches for 37 yards, but the Oilers lost in double overtime to the Dallas Texans.

Hennigan was selected by his peers as a Sporting News AFL All-League offensive end in 1961, 1962, and 1964. He was an American Football League Eastern Division All-Star five straight years (1961 - 1965), and retired after the 1966 season. He was selected to the All-Time All-AFL Second Team.

The Professional Football Researchers Association named Hennigan to the PFRA Hall of Very Good Class of 2014

Career statistics

Oilers/Titans Franchise records 

Source:   pro-football-reference.com's team encyclopedia

's NFL off-season, Charley Hennigan held at least 9 Titans franchise records, including:
 Most Receptions (season): 101 (1964)
 Most Receptions (game): 13 (1961-10-13 @BOS; tied with Sid Blanks and Haywood Jeffires and Drew Bennett)
 Most Receiving Yds (season): 1,746 (1961)
 Most Receiving Yds (game): 272 (1961-10-13 @BOS)
 Most Receiving TDs (career): 51
 Most Rec Yds/Game (career): 71.8
 Most Rec Yds/Game (season): 124.7 (1961)
 Most 100+ yard receiving games (career): 28
 Most 100+ yard receiving games (season): 10 (1961)

Later years

In 1967, Hennigan received his doctorate in education from the University of Houston. Hennigan operated an educational tutoring service in Shreveport and worked with prisoners seeking the General Equivalency Diploma (GED). Hennigan had seven children, the oldest being Charles, Jr., who was born in Natchitoches in 1957.

He was named to the Louisiana Sports Hall of Fame in 1978.

On April 6, 2002, Hennigan, then a Democrat but a registered Independent as of 2014, ran in a special election for Place 8 on the Caddo Parish Commission, his parish's governing body. He was defeated by Republican Michael Long, 2,139 votes (74.9 percent) to 716 ballots (25.1 percent).

On December 20, 2017, Hennigan died at the age of 82.

See also
List of American Football League players

References

External links
 https://web.archive.org/web/20060516141945/http://www.caddoclerk.com/results_040602.htm
 Hennigan's first AFL contract

1935 births
2017 deaths
Educators from Louisiana
American football wide receivers
Houston Oilers players
Northwestern State Demons football players
American Football League All-Star players
American Football League All-Time Team
People from Bienville, Louisiana
Players of American football from Shreveport, Louisiana
Sportspeople from Minden, Louisiana
Minden High School (Minden, Louisiana) alumni
Northwestern State University alumni
University of Houston alumni
Louisiana Democrats
Louisiana Independents
American Football League players